Valeri Mikhailovich Khlevinsky (14 November 1943 – 7 January 2021) was a Soviet and Russian theater and film actor and theater teacher. He was awarded the People's Artist of Russia in  2002. Best known for his role as Anton Savelyev in the epic series Eternal Call. He was born in Nizhny Novgorod in a family of deaf parents, and died, aged 77, in Moscow.

References

External links 

1943 births
2021 deaths
People's Artists of Russia
Moscow Art Theatre School alumni
Academic staff of Moscow Art Theatre School
Actors from Nizhny Novgorod
Burials in Troyekurovskoye Cemetery
Soviet male film actors
Russian male film actors
Soviet male stage actors
Russian male stage actors
20th-century Russian male actors
21st-century Russian male actors